FK Inter Bratislava is a football club based in Bratislava, Slovakia, temporarily playing its home matches in Stupava.

History
Inter Bratislava was founded in 1940 by the Apollo refinery (later renamed Slovnaft). Following the end of World War II and the re-establishment of Czechoslovakia, the club developed into an important force in Czechoslovak football. While it remains unclear, whether it is Inter Bratislava or FK ŠKP Inter Dúbravka Bratislava, who can claim the successful run of Červená Hviezda Bratislava in the 1950s and early 1960s as its own, club's achievements in the subsequent decades (as TJ Internacionál Slovnaft Bratislava) can be hardly disputed. Between 1962 and 1993 the club spent 29 out of 31 seasons in the Czechoslovak First League, finishing twice as runner-up in the 1970s and winning the Slovak Cup in the seasons 1983–84, 1987–88, and 1989–90. Over these years, a number of Inter players represented Czechoslovakia at senior level. In 1976, Jozef Barmoš, Ladislav Jurkemik, and Ladislav Petráš were in the squad that won the UEFA Euro 1976. Four years later, Barmoš and Jurkemik were also a part of the side that finished third at the 1980 European Championship. In a decade that followed the dissolution of Czechoslovakia, Inter went on to flourish in the newly established top tier of Slovak football as well as in the Slovak Cup, winning the Slovak double in the 1999–2000 and 2000–2001 seasons.

Inter's fall and re-establishment
Inter Bratislava won the 1. liga in the 2008–2009 season and was supposed to be promoted to the Slovak top flight. However, financial problems of the club led its owner Ľubomír Chrenko to sell Inter's licence to FK Senica in June 2009. As a result, players of the senior squad of Inter Bratislava joined Senica, whilst youth teams of Inter were preserved by the Inter Bratislava Civic Association, which had been formed from the Inter Fan Club.

The senior side was re-established in the 2010–2011 season, playing in the V. liga, i.e. the sixth tier of Slovak football. Major changes in the structure of the club were accompanied by Inter's move from the Štadión Pasienky, which had been used by the team since 1967, to the considerably smaller Štadión Drieňová ulica. After playing at the Štadión Drieňová ulica for four seasons, the senior team moved to the Štadión ŠKP Inter Dúbravka in the summer of 2014. The grounds have a capacity of 10,200. Since the season 2015/2016 due to unknown issues the Men team returned to stadium Drieňová ulica and the youth teams remained on Stadium ŠKP Inter Dúbravka. In the autumn part of the season 2016/2017 Inter was playing home matches on the stadium in Petržalka on Marie Curie-Skłodowska street (stadium of FC Petržalka akadémia), but in spring 2017 the team moved to the city of Stupava, where the team owners created the training center for Inter. The future plans are to return to Bratislava, Stupava serving as the training center.

Event timeline
 1940 – Founded as ŠK Apollo Bratislava
 1945 – Renamed TKNB Bratislava
 1948 – Renamed Sokol SNB Bratislava
 1952 – Renamed TJ Červená Hviezda Bratislava (Red Star)
 1959 – First European qualification, 1959–60
 1962 – Merged with TJ Iskra Slovnaft Bratislava and TJ Slovnaft Bratislava
 1965 – Renamed TJ Internacionál Slovnaft Bratislava
 1986 – Merged with TJ ZŤS Petržalka into TJ Internacionál Slovnaft ZŤS Bratislava
 1991 – Renamed AŠK Inter Slovnaft Bratislava
 2004 – Renamed FK Inter Bratislava
 2009 – Sold club license of FK Inter Bratislava to FK Senica
 2009 – Transforming of Inter Fan Club on Inter Bratislava o.z. (Civic association)
 2014 – Transforming of Inter Bratislava o.z. on FK Inter Bratislava a.s.

Affiliated clubs
The following clubs are affiliated with FK Inter Bratislava:
  AS Trenčín (2016–present)
  FKM Stupava (2016–present)

Stadium

Former stadium

Stadium Pasienky is a multi-use stadium in Bratislava, Slovakia. It was used mostly for football matches and was the home ground of FK Inter Bratislava. The stadium holds 13,295 people.

Current stadium

Since the 2014/2015 season, the home ground of FK Inter Bratislava has been the Štadión ŠKP Inter Dúbravka.
Since the season 2015/2016 due to unknown issues the Men team returned to stadium Drieňová ulica and the youth teams remained on Stadium ŠKP Inter Dúbravka. In the autumn part of the season 2016/2017 Inter was playing home matches on the stadium in Petržalka on Marie Curie-Skłodowska street (stadium of FC Petržalka akadémia), but in spring 2017 the team moved to the city of Stupava, where the team owners created the training center for Inter. The future plans are to return to Bratislava, Stupava serving as the training center.

Sponsorship

Honours

Domestic
 Czechoslovakia
 Czechoslovak First League (1944–93)
 Winners (1): 1958–59
 Runners-up (3): 1960–61, 1974–75, 1976–77 
 Third place (6): 1953, 1953, 1954, 1957-58, 1961-62, 1989-90, 
 1.SNL (1st Slovak National football league) (1969–1993)
 Winners (1): 1986–87

 Slovakia
 Slovak Super Liga (1993–)
 Winners (2): 1999–2000, 2000–01
 Runners-up (2): 1993–94, 1998–99
 Slovenský Pohár (Slovak Cup) (1961–)
 Winners (6): 1983–84, 1987–88, 1989–90, 1994–95, 1999–2000, 2000–01
 Runners-up (2):1975–76, 1978–79

Individual Club
The Double (League and Cup):
Winners (2): 1999–00, 2000–01

Czechoslovak and Slovak Top Goalscorer
The Czechoslovak League top scorer from 1944 to 1945 until 1992–93. Since the 1993–94 Slovak League Top scorer.

1Shared award

Europe
International Football Cup (Intertoto Cup)
 Winners (2): 1963, 1964

Mitropa Cup
 Winners (1): 1968–69
 Runners-up (1): 1969–70

Players

Current squad
As of 24 March 2019

For recent transfers, see List of Slovak football transfers winter 2018–19.

Current technical staff
Updated 17 February 2018

Transfers
Inter have produced numerous players who have gone on to represent the Slovak national football team. Over the last period there has been a steady increase of young players leaving Inter after a few years of first team football and moving on to play football in leagues of a higher standard, with the German Bundesliga (Vratislav Greško to Leverkusen in 1999), Turkish Süper Lig (Juraj Czinege to Elazığspor in 2003, Roman Kratochvíl to Denizlispor in 2002), Super League Greece (Miroslav Drobňák to Xanthi F.C. in 2003, Marián Šuchančok to Akratitos F.C. in 2002, Marián Ľalík to Panionios F.C. in 2003, Czech First League (Marek Čech and Peter Babnič to Sparta Prague in 2004 and 2001, Peter Németh to FC Baník Ostrava in 2001), Russian Premier League (Zsolt Hornyák to FC Dynamo Moscow in 2001). The top transfer was agreed in 2001 when 23years old forward and topscorer Szilárd Németh joined Premier League team Middlesbrough F.C. for a fee €6.75 million which was the highest ever paid to a Slovak club.

Record transfers

*-unofficial fee

Results

League and domestic cup history
Slovak League only (1993–present)
{|class="wikitable"
|-bgcolor="#efefef"
! style="color:#FFD700; background:#000000;"| Season
! style="color:#FFD700; background:#000000;"|    Division (Name)
! style="color:#FFD700; background:#000000;"| Pos./Teams
! style="color:#FFD700; background:#000000;"| Pl.
! style="color:#FFD700; background:#000000;"| W
! style="color:#FFD700; background:#000000;"| D
! style="color:#FFD700; background:#000000;"| L
! style="color:#FFD700; background:#000000;"| GS
! style="color:#FFD700; background:#000000;"| GA
! style="color:#FFD700; background:#000000;"| P
! style="color:#FFD700; background:#000000;"| Slovak Cup
! style="color:#FFD700; background:#000000;" colspan=2|Europe
! style="color:#FFD700; background:#000000;"| Top scorer (Goals)
|-
|align=center|1993–94
|align=center|1st (1. liga)
|align=center bgcolor=silver|2/(12)
|align=center|32
|align=center|18
|align=center|4
|align=center|10
|align=center|65
|align=center|45
|align=center|40
|align=center|Semi-finals
|align=center|
|align=center|
|align=center|  Martin Obšitník (14)
|-
|align=center|1994–95
|align=center|1st (1. liga)
|align=center bgcolor=cc9966|3/(12)
|align=center|32
|align=center|14
|align=center|8
|align=center|10
|align=center|47
|align=center|45
|align=center|50
|align=center bgcolor=gold|Winner
|align=center|UC
|align=center|PR ( MYPA)
|align=center|
|-
|align=center|1995–96
|align=center|1st (1. liga)
|align=center|9/(12)
|align=center|32
|align=center|11
|align=center|7
|align=center|14
|align=center|42
|align=center|45
|align=center|40
|align=center|2.R
|align=center|CWC
|align=center|1.R ( Zaragoza)
|align=center|  Jaroslav Timko (9)
|-
|align=center|1996–97
|align=center|1st (1. liga)
|align=center|4/(16)
|align=center|30
|align=center|13
|align=center|9
|align=center|8
|align=center|38
|align=center|35
|align=center|48
|align=center|Semi-finals
|align=center|
|align=center|
|align=center|  Rolf Landerl (10)
|-
|align=center|1997–98
|align=center|1st (Mars Superliga)
|align=center bgcolor=cc9966|3/(16)
|align=center|30
|align=center|18
|align=center|6
|align=center|6
|align=center|55
|align=center|25
|align=center|60
|align=center|Semi-finals
|align=center|
|align=center|
|align=center|  Peter Babnič (9)
|-
|align=center|1998–99
|align=center|1st (Mars Superliga)
|align=center bgcolor=silver|2/(16)
|align=center|30
|align=center|21
|align=center|5
|align=center|4
|align=center|64
|align=center|15
|align=center|68
|align=center|Quarter-finals
|align=center| UC
|align=center| Q2 ( Slavia Prague)
|align=center|  Peter Babnič (13)
|-
|align=center|1999–00
|align=center|1st (Mars Superliga)
|align=center bgcolor=gold|1/(16)
|align=center|30
|align=center|21
|align=center|7
|align=center|2
|align=center|65
|align=center|16
|align=center|70
|align=center bgcolor=gold|Winner
|align=center| UC
|align=center| 2.R ( FC Nantes)
|align=center|  Szilárd Németh (16)
|-
|align=center|2000–01
|align=center|1st (Mars Superliga)
|align=center bgcolor=gold|1/(10)
|align=center|36
|align=center|25
|align=center|5
|align=center|6
|align=center|73
|align=center|28
|align=center|80
|align=center bgcolor=gold|Winner
|align=center| CL  UC
|align=center| Q3 ( Lyon)  2.R ( Lokomotiv)
|align=center|  Szilárd Németh (23)
|-
|align=center|2001–02
|align=center|1st (Mars Superliga)
|align=center bgcolor=cc9966|3/(10)
|align=center|36
|align=center|16
|align=center|8
|align=center|12
|align=center|53
|align=center|39
|align=center|56
|align=center|Quarter-finals
|align=center| CL  UC
|align=center| Q3 ( Rosenborg)  1.R ( Litex)
|align=center|  Miroslav Drobňák (9)
|-
|align=center|2002–03
|align=center|1st (1. liga)
|align=center|6/(10)
|align=center|36
|align=center|12
|align=center|7
|align=center|17
|align=center|48
|align=center|58
|align=center|43
|align=center|1.R
|align=center|
|align=center|
|align=center|  Miroslav Drobňák (10)   Juraj Halenár (10)
|-
|align=center|2003–04
|align=center|1st (Corgoň Liga)
|align=center|7/(10)
|align=center|36
|align=center|12
|align=center|9
|align=center|15
|align=center|38
|align=center|44
|align=center|45
|align=center|2.R
|align=center|
|align=center|
|align=center|  Juraj Halenár (9)
|-
|align=center|2004–05
|align=center|1st (Corgoň Liga)
|align=center|9/(10)
|align=center|36
|align=center|9
|align=center|11
|align=center|16
|align=center|37
|align=center|60
|align=center|38
|align=center|Quarter-finals
|align=center|
|align=center|
|align=center|  Juraj Halenár (12)
|-
|align=center|2005–06
|align=center|1st (Corgoň Liga)
|align=center|9/(10)
|align=center|36
|align=center|7
|align=center|9
|align=center|20
|align=center|27
|align=center|62
|align=center|30
|align=center|2.R
|align=center|
|align=center|
|align=center|  Marián Tomčák (6)
|-
|align=center|2006–07
|align=center |1st (Corgoň Liga)
|align=center bgcolor=red|13/(16)
|align=center|36
|align=center|11
|align=center|11
|align=center|14
|align=center|39
|align=center|40
|align=center|44
|align=center|3.R
|align=center|
|align=center|
|align=center|  Radoslav Kunzo (6)
|-
|align=center|2007–08
|align=center|2nd (1. liga)
|align=center|3/(12)
|align=center|33
|align=center|15
|align=center|8
|align=center|10
|align=center|49
|align=center|40
|align=center|53
|align=center|Quarter-finals
|align=center|
|align=center|
|align=center|  Tomáš Majtán (16)
|-
|align=center|2008–09
|align=center|2nd (1. liga)
|align=center bgcolor=green|1/(12)
|align=center|33
|align=center|19
|align=center|10
|align=center|4
|align=center|64
|align=center|27
|align=center|67
|align=center|2.R
|align=center|
|align=center|
|align=center|
|-
|align=center|2009–10
|align=center bgcolor=black|
|align=center bgcolor=black|
|align=center bgcolor=black|
|align=center bgcolor=black|
|align=center bgcolor=black|
|align=center bgcolor=black|
|align=center bgcolor=black|
|align=center bgcolor=black|
|align=center bgcolor=black|
|align=center bgcolor=black|
|align=center bgcolor=black|
|align=center bgcolor=black|
|align=center bgcolor=black|
|-
|align=center|2010–11
|align=center|6th (V. liga Seniori BA-Mesto)
|align=center bgcolor=green|1/(12)
|align=center|22
|align=center|18
|align=center|2
|align=center|2
|align=center|72
|align=center|15
|align=center|56
|align=center|
|align=center|
|align=center|
|align=center|
|-
|align=center|2011–12
|align=center|5th (IV. liga Seniori BA-Mesto)
|align=center bgcolor=green|1/(14)
|align=center|26
|align=center|16
|align=center|6
|align=center|4
|align=center|62
|align=center|28
|align=center|54
|align=center|
|align=center|
|align=center|
|align=center|
|-
|align=center|2012–13
|align=center|4th (Majstrovstvá regiónu BA)
|align=center|7/(16)
|align=center|30
|align=center|13
|align=center|7
|align=center|10
|align=center|42
|align=center|33
|align=center|46
|align=center|
|align=center|
|align=center|
|align=center|
|-
|align=center|2013–14
|align=center|4th (Majstrovstvá regiónu BA)
|align=center bgcolor=green|1/(17)
|align=center|32
|align=center|21
|align=center|9
|align=center|2
|align=center|83
|align=center|24
|align=center|72
|align=center|
|align=center|
|align=center|
|align=center|
|-
|align=center|2014–15
|align=center|3rd (III. liga Bratislava)
|align=center|6/(16)
|align=center|30
|align=center|13
|align=center|8
|align=center|9
|align=center|46
|align=center|41
|align=center|47
|align=center|4.R
|align=center|
|align=center|
|align=center|
|-
|align=center|2015–16
|align=center|3rd (III. liga Bratislava)
|align=center|2/(16)
|align=center|30
|align=center|18
|align=center|6
|align=center|6
|align=center|70
|align=center|20
|align=center|60
|align=center|2.R
|align=center|
|align=center|
|align=center|  Patrik Fedor (13)
|-
|align=center|2016–17
|align=center|3rd (III. liga Bratislava)
|align=center bgcolor=green|1/(16)
|align=center|30
|align=center|24
|align=center|4
|align=center|2
|align=center|93
|align=center|11
|align=center|76
|align=center|3.R
|align=center|
|align=center|
|align=center|  Jakub Šulc (23)
|-
|align=center|2017–18
|align=center|2nd (DOXXbet liga)
|align=center|8/(16)
|align=center|30
|align=center|12
|align=center|5
|align=center|13
|align=center|45
|align=center|46
|align=center|41
|align=center|5.R
|align=center|
|align=center|
|align=center|  Erik Prekop (8)
|-
|align=center|2018–19
|align=center|2nd (II. liga)
|align=center bgcolor=red|14/(16)
|align=center|30
|align=center|8
|align=center|5
|align=center|17
|align=center|37
|align=center|56
|align=center|29 
|align=center|4.R
|align=center|
|align=center|
|align=center|  Jakub Šulc (11)
|-
|align=center|2019–20
|align=center|3rd (III. liga)
|align=center|2/(16)
|align=center|15
|align=center|11
|align=center|2
|align=center|2
|align=center|46
|align=center|16
|align=center|35 
|align=center|Not enter
|align=center|
|align=center|
|align=center|  Tomáš Majtán (14)
|-
|align=center|2020–21
|align=center|3rd (III. liga)
|align=center|2/(16)
|align=center|15
|align=center|10
|align=center|1
|align=center|4
|align=center|53
|align=center|21
|align=center|31 
|align=center|Not enter
|align=center|
|align=center|
|align=center|  Tomáš Majtán (13)
|-
|align=center|2021–22
|align=center|3rd (III. liga)
|align=center|3/(16)
|align=center|30
|align=center|21
|align=center|6
|align=center|3
|align=center|79
|align=center|18
|align=center|69 
|align=center|Not enter
|align=center|
|align=center|
|align=center|  Andrej Labuda (18)
|}

European competition history

Player records

Most goals

Notable players
Had international caps for their respective countries. Players whose name is listed in bold represented their countries while playing for Inter.

Past (and present) players who are the subjects of Wikipedia articles can be found here.

Managers

   József Ember (1953)
   František Kolman (1954–55)
   Theodor Reimann (1955–57)
   Karol Borhy (1958–1960)
   Arnošt Hložek (1962–1966)
   Ladislav Kačáni (1967–1970)
   Jozef Marko (1970–1972)
   František Skyva (1972)
   Valér Švec (1972–1978)
   Michal Vičan (1978–1980)
   Justín Javorek (1980–1982)
   Arnošt Hložek (1982–1984)
   Štefan Šimončič (1984)
   Michal Vičan (1984–1986)
   Karol Kögl (1986–1988)
   Vladimír Hrivnák (1988)
   Jozef Adamec (1989–1991)
   Jozef Jankech (1991–1992)
   Jozef Adamec (1992–1993)
   Ladislav Petráš (1994)
   Karel Brückner (1995)
   Jozef Adamec (1995)
   Jozef Valovič (1996)
   Jozef Bubenko (1996–2002)
   Jozef Valovič (1996)
   Jozef Bubenko (1996–2002)
   Jozef Barmoš (2004–2005)
   Ladislav Jurkemik (2006–2008)
   Vladimír Koník (2007–2009)
   Peter Fieber (2009)
   Jozef Barmoš (2009–2016)
   Richard Slezák (2016–2017)
   Jozef Barmoš (2017)
   Jozef Brezovský (2018)
   Miroslav Jantek (2018–2019)
   Michal Pančík (2019–2021)
   Ladislav Hudec (2022)
   Andrej Štellár (2023-)

References

External links
 
 AŠK Inter website
 Fan website

 
Bratislava, Inter
Football clubs in Bratislava
Association football clubs established in 1940
1940 establishments in Slovakia
Bratislava, Inter
Bratislava, Inter